is a Japanese manga artist famous for creating Initial D. Shigeno has also created Bari Bari Densetsu, Dopkan, and Tunnel Nuketara Sky Blue ("First Love in Summer") all prior to the manga that would make him famous in 1995. In 1985, he received the Kodansha Manga Award in shōnen for Bari Bari Densetsu.

Early life
Shuichi Shigeno was born in Matsunoyama, Tokamachi City, Niigata Prefecture. When Shigeno was in high school, he was obsessed with motorcycles, which resulted in one of his best-selling series, Bari Bari Densetsu. Before Shigeno became a manga artist, he was a poor student. Still, after Baribari Densetsu sold well and got a lot of money from royalties on the first edition, he bought his first car (Toyota AE86) and lived in his small apartment.

Career
After Bari Bari Densetsu was sold, Shigeno wanted to make another book. And one of Shigeno's friends told Shigeno he liked cars, "so why not write it down?" Shigeno then thought about the idea, but part of him resisted, due to going out of business if writing about cars does not work out. Since Shigeno was writing about cars, he used his first car Toyota AE86 to help him write about Initial D. After Initial D was published, it became a huge hit. Later on, after Initial D ended, he started a new series called MF Ghost. MF Ghost is a series that continues most of Initial D's legacy in focusing on racing theories and cars, which is still continuing today. However, lately due to Shigeno's declining health, MF Ghost will be on a hiatus to prevent Shigeno from overworking  Rumors have spread that Shigeno will continue MF Ghost when he is going to feel better in 2023.

Shuichi Shigeno and his Toyota AE86 Trueno
Shigeno bought his AE86 Toyota Sprinter Trueno right after he got royalties from Bari Bari Densetsu. At first, Shigeno picked the Sprinter Trueno because his father only drove Toyota cars. After going to a Toyota dealership, Shigeno bought the Sprinter Trueno because it had just undergone a model change and it was not particularly expensive. Plus, it was stylish and cool to drive. For the first two years of owning his AE86, Shigeno only used it practically to help with his daily life. In between work, Shigeno would often times go to the mountains of Gunma and drive there when there were no regular cars. To this day, Shigeno still has his AE86 and drives around in the middle of the night.

Most recognized works
Initial D 
MF Ghost 
Bari Bari Densetsu

Works
Bari Bari Densetsu (1983–1991, serialized in Weekly Shōnen Magazine, Kodansha)
Tunnel Nuketara Sky*Blue (1992, serialized in Weekly Young Magazine, Kodansha)
Shō (1992, serialized in Weekly Shōnen Magazine, Kodansha)
DO-P-KAN (1993–1995, serialized in Weekly Young Magazine, Kodansha)
Initial D (1995–2013, serialized in Weekly Young Magazine, Kodansha)
Takane no Hana (2014, serialized in Weekly Young Magazine, Kodansha)
Sailor Ace (2015–2017, serialized in Weekly Young Magazine, Kodansha)
MF Ghost (2017–ongoing, serialized in Weekly Young Magazine, Kodansha)

References

External links
 
 
 Shuichi Shigeno manga at Media Arts Database 
 The TAFL.org approved fanlisting for Shuichi Shigeno!
 Initial D world

Living people
Manga artists from Niigata Prefecture
Winner of Kodansha Manga Award (Shōnen)
1958 births